Ameritown is the debut album by indie rock band Eastern Conference Champions.  It was released on July 17, 2007 through Suretone Records, an imprint of Geffen Records.

Track listing
The Box – 4:12
Noah – 3:33
Some Sorta Light – 4:12
Stutter – 3:12
Single Sedative – 2:45
Yuppy Hipster Fuck – 5:02
To the Wind – 2:50
Pitch a Fit – 3:05
Gucci No. 3 – 3:10
Nice Clean Shirt – 2:59
Rabbit Hole – 5:04
Hollywood.... – 9:08

References

External links
Official website

2007 debut albums
Eastern Conference Champions albums
Albums produced by Thom Panunzio